William Dowling McIntosh (7 December 1919 – 1990) was a Scottish footballer who played in his native land for St Johnstone, and in England for Blackpool, Preston North End, Stoke City and Walsall.

Career
McIntosh was born in Glasgow and began his career with St Johnstone, spending much of the duration of World War II playing for Rangers before joining English side Preston North End in 1946. He made a strong impact in his first season in English football, scoring 32 goals in 44 matches. He scored 17 the following season and with Preston struggling he left for Blackpool. At Bloomfield Road he struggled to establish himself in a star-studded squad and he joined Stoke City in September 1952 after playing 56 matches for Blackpool scoring 16 goals in four seasons. At Stoke he played 25 matches scoring six goals in 1951–52 and ended his career with a season at Walsall.

Career statistics
Source:

References

External links
 

1919 births
1990 deaths
Scottish footballers
St Johnstone F.C. players
English Football League players
Stoke City F.C. players
Blackpool F.C. players
Preston North End F.C. players
Walsall F.C. players
Footballers from Glasgow
Scottish Football League players
Fleetwood Town F.C. players
Petershill F.C. players
Association football forwards
Scottish Junior Football Association players
Rangers F.C. wartime guest players
Third Lanark A.C. wartime guest players